is a 1990 Japanese comedy film directed and written by Juzo Itami. It stars Nobuko Miyamoto as a geisha who brings good luck to her intimate companions and Masahiko Tsugawa as a man who crosses paths with her by chance.

Cast 
Nobuko Miyamoto as Nayoko
Masahiko Tsugawa as Mondo Suzuki
Ryunosuke Kaneda as Tamonin
Atsuko Ichinomiya as Rin, Tamonin's mother
Kin Sugai as Foster mother
Kazuyo Mita as Hiyoko
Mitsuko Ishii as Eiko
Yoriko Douguchi as Junko
Maiko Minami as Sayori-chan
Fukumi Kuroda as Kiyoka
Isao Hashizume
Haruna Takase as Fur shop manager
Tokuko Sugiyama as Restaurant manager
Yakan Yanagi as Foster father
Michiyo Yokoyama as Tamonin's court lady
Hiroko Seki as Shinkame Chiyo restaurant manager
Noborou Yano as Hirutaji chief
Yan Yano as Hirutaji chief
Harukazu Kitami as Bo-san #1
Akira Kubo as Bo-san #2
Yoshihiro Kato as Segawa Kikunojo
Akari Uchida as Houte couture woman
Mihoko Shibata as Woman carer in movie
Mansaku Fuwa as Executioner's assistant in the dream
Yôichi Ueda as Camera man
Shinobu Oshizaka as Doctor
Eijirō Tōno as Prime Minister
Kiyokata Saruwaka as Traditional dance teacher
Kazuo Kitamura as Tsurumaru
Akira Takarada as Inukai
Shōgo Shimada as Zenbu Okura
Hideji Ōtaki as Chijiwa (uncredited)
Hiroshi Okouchi as Chichiiwa

Release
A-Ge-Man: Tales of a Golden Geisha was distributed theatrically in Japan by Toho on 2 June 1990. The film was shown at the Chicago International Film Festival on October 10, 1990 and at the Japan Today Film Festival in Los Angeles on November 1, 1991.

Reception
A-Ge-Man: Tales of a Golden Geisha was nominated for four Japanese Academy Awards—Best Director (Juzo Itami), Best Actress (Nobuko Miyamoto), Best Screenplay (Juzo Itami) and Best Editing (Akira Suzuki).

References

Footnotes

Sources

External links

1990 films
1990s sex comedy films
Films directed by Jūzō Itami
Japanese sex comedy films
1990 comedy films
1990s Japanese films